Philipp Ruhig (March 31, 1675— June 4, 1749) was a Lithuanian Lutheran priest from East Prussia mostly known as a philosopher and philologist, an early expert in Lithuanian language.

Major works
1745:  "Betrachtung der Littauischen Sprache, in ihrem Ursprunge, Wesen und   Eigenschaften"
1747: "Littauisch-Deutschen und  Deutsch-Littauischen Lexicon"

References

Further reading
  Ruigys P. Lietuvių kalbos kilmės, būdo ir savybių tyrinėjimas. Vaga: 1986, Vilnius. 484 p. (Lituanistinė biblioteka; preface by Vytautas Mažiulis) 

Balticists
1675 births
1749 deaths
People from East Prussia
Lithuanian language
18th-century German Lutheran clergy